"Cuore matto" is a song composed by Armando Ambrosino and Totò Savio, and performed by Little Tony. The song premiered at the seventeenth Sanremo Music Festival, in which Little Tony presented the song in couple with Mario Zelinotti.

The single peaked at first place  for nine consecutive weeks on the Italian hit parade. It sold in excess of a million copies and was awarded a gold disc in May 1967.

The song also named a film, Cuore matto... matto da legare , directed by Mario Amendola and starred by the same Little Tony and by Eleonora Brown.

The song was later covered by several artists, including Dalida, Gianni Morandi, Teruhiko Saigō, Fausto Leali and Kati Kovács. It was also used in several films, notably Bernardo Bertolucci's Besieged and Pedro Almodóvar's Bad Education.

Track listing
7" single – Ld A 7500  
 "Cuore matto" (Armando Ambrosino, Totò Savio) 
 "Gente che mi parla di te" (Little Tony, Mario Capuano, Tony Cucchiara)

References

 

1967 singles
Italian songs
Number-one singles in Italy
1967 songs
Sanremo Music Festival songs
Songs written by Totò Savio